Matsukata (written: 松方) is a Japanese surname. Notable people with the surname include:

, Japanese actor
, 4th and 6th Prime Minister of Japan
, Japanese Scout leader

See also
Haru Matsukata Reischauer, journalist, granddaughter of Matsukata Masayoshi and wife of Edwin O. Reischauer
Miye Matsukata, jewelry designer
Tané Matsukata, educator

Japanese-language surnames